John Mathwin OAM (20 June 1919 – 18 June 2004) was an Australian politician. He was the Liberal candidate for the 1955 election for the federal seat of Bonython, but was easily defeated. He was elected as the member for Glenelg in the South Australian House of Assembly in 1970 and held the seat until it's abolition in 1985. He stood for Bright at the 1985 election, however he was defeated.

He received the Medal of the Order of Australia in June 2001 for service to the community, to local government and to the South Australian Parliament.

References

 

1919 births
2004 deaths
Liberal Party of Australia members of the Parliament of South Australia
Members of the South Australian House of Assembly
Recipients of the Medal of the Order of Australia
Liberal and Country League politicians